Gorkhi-Terelj National Park (creek-rhododendron) is one of the national parks of Mongolia.  The Terelj tourist zone has a number of "tourist camps" (juulchny baaz).  It is connected with Ulaanbaatar by a paved road (main road to the East #A0501 Baganuur-Öndörkhaan direction, 37 km from Ulaanbaatar city center, left turn to the branch #A24,  5 km later road crosses Tuul River and the National park territory begins). The road comes to the Gorkhiin Davaa pass.  Most of the tourist camps and tourist attractions are before this pass. The road then ends at the settlement of Terelj, which features small shops and restaurants. The Terelj settlement is located in the valley of the Terelj River (Terelj Gol), approximately 66 km from the Ulaanbaatar city center. The national park tourist zone is formally in Nalaikh düüreg (district) part of Ulaanbaatar municipality, the rest of the protected zone beginning  to the north of the Terelj River, is located in Mongolia's Töv Province (Töv aimag).

A small southern portion of the park is developed for tourists, with restaurants, souvenir shops, horses and camels for rent, and tourist ger camps, many of them run by the Juulchin corporation, the former state tourism company. However, most of the park is undeveloped and difficult to access. Attractions include Khagiin Khar Lake, a 20 m deep glacial lake 80 km upstream from the tourist camps, and Yestii Hot Water Springs, natural hot springs 18 km further upstream. The park also has a Buddhist monastery that is open to visitors.  Park wildlife includes brown bears and over 250 species of birds. The Tuul River flows through the park. 

The park has many rock formations for rock climbers, and includes two famous formations named for things they resemble: Turtle Rock (Mongolian: Melkhii Khad) and the Old Man Reading a Book (Praying Lama Rock).

Many Westerners were introduced to Gorkhi-Terelj National Park when the CBS reality television program The Amazing Race visited the park in the second episode of its tenth season.

See also
 List of national parks of Mongolia

References

External links

Tourist review of the park
MSNBC Travel article about the park
USA Today Travel article about the park
Official The Amazing Race website recapping the show's visit to Terelj
Map of Park Boundaries, OpenStreetMap.org

National parks of Mongolia